The Rapid Eye Mount telescope (REM) is a fully automatic, 60 cm aperture telescope located at ESO's La Silla Observatory at 2,400 metres altitude on the edge of the Atacama Desert in Chile. The telescope's aim is to catch the afterglows of gamma-ray bursts (GRBs). REM is triggered by a signal from a high-energy satellite such as Swift and rapidly points to the detected location in the sky. It is operated for the Italian National Institute for Astrophysics since 2002.

Telescope 

The telescope has been designed to be a fast pointing instrument, and its relatively small size is in fact balanced by a 10°/s accurate fast pointing. This velocity makes REM suitable for immediate response to random alerts.

The telescope hosts two instruments: REMIR, an infrared imaging camera, and ROSS, a visible imager and slitless spectrograph. The two cameras can observe simultaneously thanks to a dichroic placed before telescope focus the same field of view of 10×10 arc minutes. In the infrared range from 1 to 2.3 µm REMIR can use a (z′, J, H, K′) filter set. ROSS is equipped with a standard filter set (V, R, I) and an slitless Amici prism.

The observing procedure is completely robotic and the nightly schedule is optimized for the observation of scheduled targets but it is immediately overdriven by GRB (or other) alerts. Typically REM can observe the new target after 30 seconds from notification. 

REM has been installed in its place during June 2003 and has been gathering data on GRB and other sources since then. Also it is a bench for experimental instrumentation and equipment. 

In 2006 a wide-field camera parallel to the REM telescope, the TORTORA camera (Telescopio Ottimizzato per la Ricerca dei Transienti Ottici RApidi) was installed. TORTORA has a field of view of 24°x32° through an objective of 120 mm diameter. The instrument was optimized for photometry of fast transients with a best time resolution of about 0.1 s.

The observatory is operated for the Instituto Nazionale di Astrofisica by the REM Team.

Main results
Since its installation and commissioning at ESO, REM rapid and multi-band observations allowed to contribute to several important discoveries in some cases widely reported by ESO press releases; for instance, the observations a few seconds after its discovery of GRB060418, GRB06067A and GRB080319B.

In addition, a larger set of observations of targets different from GRBs has been performed, securing long time series of data for variable stars, AGNs, etc.

References

External links
 INAF REM site
 ESO press release about GRB060418 and GRB060607A
 ESO press release about GRB080319B
 REM and TORTORA

See also
 TAROT-South robotic observatory, an even smaller and faster-moving telescope also at La Silla

Astronomical instruments
Robotic telescopes